Titius Quartinus (died 235 AD) was a Roman usurper.

After the death of Alexander Severus and the usurpation of Maximinus Thrax, a unit of archers from Osrhoene in Mesopotamia, proclaimed Quartinus, a former provincial governor and friend of emperor Alexander Severus, purportedly against his own will. Those archers were led by Macedo and claimed to want revenge for Alexander's death. Quartinus himself was dismissed from the army by Maximinus after Alexander's death.

But later, Macedo betrayed Quartinus, killed him, and presented his head to Maximinus. Maximinus had Macedo executed nevertheless.

Quartinus story was written down by historian Herodianus. No other independent source mentions him, however, and thus some scholars believe Quartinus is purely an invention of Herodianus.

Sources
Herodianus, History of the Roman Empire, 7,1,9-10

235 deaths
3rd-century Roman usurpers
Year of birth unknown
Romans from unknown gentes